Hans Amundsen (23 March 1885 – 5 May 1967) was a Norwegian journalist and politician for the Labour and Social Democratic Labour parties.

He was born in Vestre Aker. He was a sub-editor in Fremtiden from 1907 to 1914, journalist in Social-Demokraten from 1914 to 1919, then editor-in-chief of Folket from 1919 to 1921.

In 1921 the Social Democratic Labour Party split from the Labour Party, and Amundsen worked in their main organ Den Nye Social-Demokraten from 1921 to 1927. The party reunited with Labour in 1927, and Amundsen returned to Arbeiderbladet (formerly Social-Demokraten) and spent the rest of his career there.

He was also a local politician, biographer of Christopher Hornsrud (1939) and Trygve Lie (1946), and was a board member of the Norwegian Broadcasting Corporation from 1935 to 1956.

References

1885 births
1967 deaths
Journalists from Oslo
Norwegian biographers
Norwegian male writers
Male biographers
Labour Party (Norway) politicians
Social Democratic Labour Party of Norway politicians
20th-century Norwegian journalists
Politicians from Oslo